Williston Basin School District 7 (WBSD7) is a school district headquartered in Williston, North Dakota.

History
In 2020 a vote was held on whether it was to merge the Williston School District 1 with the Williams County Public School District 8 to form a new district. The respective votes in each district were 2,527 in District 1 (86.6%) and 541 (59.6%) in District 8, while the no votes were 391 (13.4%) in District 1 and 367 (40.4%) in District 8.

All members of the North Dakota State Board of Public School Education approved the merger plans.

In 2021 the districts officially merged. There are seven board seats, with two for people outside of the Williston city limits.

Schools
 High schools
 Williston High School (Williston)
 Del Easton Alternative High School (Williston)

 Middle schools
 Williston Middle School (Williston)
 Missouri Ridge School (unincorporated area)
 ASB Innovation Academy

 Elementary Schools
 Bakken Elementary School (Williston)
 Garden Valley Elementary School (unincorporated area)
 Hagan Elementary School (Williston)
 Lewis & Clark Elementary School (Williston)
 McVay Elementary School (Williston)
 Rickard Elementary School (Williston)
 Round Prairie Elementary School (unincorporated area)
 Wilkinson Elementary School (Williston)

References

External links
 Williston Basin School District 7

2021 establishments in North Dakota
Educational institutions established in 2021
School districts in North Dakota
Williston, North Dakota
Education in Williams County, North Dakota